Herron Run is a stream in the U.S. state of West Virginia.

Herron Run has the name of Robert Herron, a local pioneer.

See also
List of rivers of West Virginia

References

Rivers of Hancock County, West Virginia
Rivers of West Virginia